Dharmapuri taluk is a taluk in the Dharmapuri district of the Indian state of Tamil Nadu. The headquarters of the taluk is the town of Dharmapuri.

Demographics
According to the 2011 census, the taluk of Dharmapuri had a population of 441,115 with 225,969 males and 215,146 females. There were 952 women for every 1,000 men. The taluk had a literacy rate of 64.96%. Child population in the age group below 6 was 24,262 Males and 22,372 Females.

Politics
It is part of the Dharmapuri (state assembly constituency) and Dharmapuri (Lok Sabha constituency).

References

Taluks of Dharmapuri district